Carina Heights is both a hill and a suburb in the City of Brisbane, Queensland, Australia.

Geography 
Carina Heights borders Camp Hill, Carina, Carindale, Mansfield, Mount Gravatt East, and Holland Park.

It is within Whites Hill Reserve which occupies the south-west of the suburb, extending into neighbouring Camp Hill. Most of the developed recreational facilities are in the Camp Hill part of the reserve. The major use of the reserve within Carina Heights is the former Pine Mountain quarry, which is now used as a site to recycle asphalt removed from roads to create new asphalt.

History
Carina Heights is named after the neighbouring suburb Carina, from which it was officially separated in 1975. The name Carina comes from an estate on Creek Road constructed in the 1850s. The property belonged to Ebenezer Thorne, and was named after Thorne's daughter Kate Carina Thorne.

The 2011 census recorded 6,110 residents in Carina Heights, of whom 52.5% were female and 47.5% were male. The median age of the population was 35; 2 years below the Australian median. 72.3% of people living in Carina Heights were born in Australia compared to the national average of 69.8%, with the next most common countries of birth being New Zealand (4.3%), England (3.3%), South Korea (1.3%), India (1.1%), and the Philippines (1%). 80.8% of people spoke only English at home; the next most popular languages were Spanish (1.5%), Korean (1.4%), Italian (1.4%), Greek (1%), and Cantonese 0.9%.

Education
There are no schools in Carina Heights. The nearest government primary schools are Whites Hill State College in neighbouring Camp Hill to the west, Carina State School in neighbouring Carina to the north, and Mount Gravatt East State School in neighbouring Mount Gravatt East. The nearest government secondary schools are Whites Hill State College in neighbouring Camp Hill to the west and Cavendish Road State High School in neighbouring Holland Park to the south-west.

Facilities 
Belmont Private Hospital is a 150-bed private psychiatric hospital. It is at 1220 Creek Road on the top of the hill Carina Heights.

Amenities
Living Faith Uniting Church is at 330 Pine Mountain Road. It holds weekly Sunday services.

There are a number of parks in the suburb, including:

 Abbott Street Park
 Anzac Road Park

 Buckley Street Park

 Gaffney Street Park

 Jones Road Park

 Olivia Drive Park

 Pine Mountain Road (no. 284)

 Whatmore Street Park

 Whites Hill Reserve

 Willard Street Park

Street names
A number of street names in Carina Heights are identical to the surnames of former Members of the Queensland Legislative Assembly. These include:
 Buckley Street
 Buzacott Street
 Chataway Street
 Jones Road
 Macalister Street
 Maughan Street
 McGahan Street
 Summerville Street
 Swayne Street
 Wilkinson Street
 Winstanley Street

Some other street names are identical to the surnames of prominent citizens of Brisbane. These include:
 Hecklemann Street
 Whatmore Street - may have been named for George Willoughby Whatmore, a Brisbane motor dealer, yachting official and city councillor. He was, for the four years prior to his death, the owner of the historic home Nyrambla in the suburb of Ascot.

Another group of street names are derived from World War I. They include:
 Anzac Road
 Birdwood Road
 Gallipoli Road
 Mons Road
 Salonica Road
 Vickers Street

References

External links
 
 
 

Suburbs of the City of Brisbane